Mezraa station is located near the village of Mezra in the Kars Province of Turkey. The railway to Baku will split from the line here. It is serviced by the daily Kars-Akyaka Regional train.

Railway stations in Kars Province
Railway stations opened in 1899
1899 establishments in the Russian Empire
Kars Central District